Lenox Township is a township in Iowa County, Iowa, USA.

History
Lenox Township was established in 1855.

References

Townships in Iowa County, Iowa
Townships in Iowa